George Guy Greville, 4th Earl of Warwick, 4th Earl Brooke (28 March 1818 – 2 December 1893), styled Lord Brooke from 1818 to 1853, was an English Tory politician, bibliophile and collector.

Early life

Greville was born in Charles Street, Berkeley Square, London. He was the only child of Henry Greville, 3rd Earl of Warwick, and the former Lady Sarah Elizabeth Savile, eldest daughter of John Savile, 2nd Earl of Mexborough.

He was educated at St John's College, Oxford, from where he obtained a BA in 1839.

Career
He was Member of Parliament (MP) for South Warwickshire from 1845 to 1853, when he succeeded to the peerage. He served as honorary colonel to the Warwickshire Yeomanry cavalry, and as A.D.C. to Queen Victoria.

He joined the Canterbury Association on 11 February 1850 and was, from the day of joining, a member of the management committee.

Collector

Lord Warwick was also a prolific contributor to the improvements of Warwick Castle during the nineteenth century. Alongside his artistic wife, Anne Charteris 4th Countess of Warwick, he oversaw the redecoration of the castle's Great Hall and domestic apartments after the fire of 1871. The celebrated architect Anthony Salvin was employed to rebuild the hall in the typical Victorian 'Gothic' taste, embellished with stained glass to achieve the effect of a medieval baronial hall. The domestic apartments were also redesigned, with each room assigned a different 'historical' style, typical of the nineteenth century interest in the 'Romantic Interior'.

Known as a prolific collector of books, Lord Warwick established a Shakespeare Library at Warwick Castle with the help of James Halliwell-Phillipps during the years 1852–1870. The entire contents of the library was sold after his death in 1897 to the Folger Shakespeare Library, Washington, D.C.

Lord Warwick was also a great collector of arms and armour, most of which was purchased through the legendary New Bond Street dealer and forger Samuel Luke Pratt (1805–1878). Many of the greatest pieces were acquired by Pratt from the dispersed collection of Samuel Rush Meyrick and later sold to Greville. Alongside original pieces Pratt sold the Earl several Victorian forgeries, a practise that was fairly common place of dealers in Antique furniture and arms and armour at the time.

Personal life
On 18 February 1852, he married Anne Charteris (1829–1903), daughter of Francis Wemyss-Charteris, 9th Earl of Wemyss. They had five children:

 Francis Greville, 5th Earl of Warwick (1853–1924).
 Alwyn Greville (1854–1929), who married Mabel Elizabeth Georgina Smith OBE (d. 1940), only daughter of Ernald Mosley Smith of Selsdon Park (son of banker George Robert Smith), in 1888.
 Louis Greville (1856–1941), the High Sheriff of Wiltshire in 1920 who married Lily Gordon (d. 1898), a daughter of J. H. Gordon, in 1887.
 Lady Eva Greville (1860–1940), who married Col. Frank Dugdale CVO, second son of James Dugdale of Wroxall Abbey, in 1895.
 Sidney Greville (1866–1927), who served as Private Secretary to Queen Alexandra.

He died at Warwick Castle on 2 December 1893.

See also
Earl of Warwick
List of owners of Warwick Castle

References

External links 

 

1818 births
1893 deaths
Alumni of St John's College, Oxford
Earls in the Peerage of Great Britain
George
Members of the Parliament of the United Kingdom for English constituencies
UK MPs 1841–1847
UK MPs 1847–1852
UK MPs 1852–1857
Warwick, E4
Members of the Canterbury Association
4